Calvin Miles Dickinson (born 3 November 1996) is a South African-born English cricketer who plays for Hampshire County Cricket Club. He is primarily a wicket-keeper who bats right-handed. 

He received his early education at St Edward’s School, Oxford.

Career
Having made his debut in 2016 for Oxford MCCU, playing two first-class matches, he joined Hampshire on a 'Hampshire scholarship' in the summer of 2017. He made his debut for Hampshire against South Africa A on 8 June 2017, scoring 99 in his first innings and 13 in his second, while taking 4 catches.

He made his Twenty20 cricket debut for Hampshire in the 2017 NatWest t20 Blast on 10 August 2017. He made his List A debut for Hampshire in the 2017–18 Regional Super50 on 1 February 2018.

References

External links
 

1996 births
Living people
Cricketers from Durban
English cricketers
Hampshire cricketers
Oxford MCCU cricketers